Oxalis latifolia is a species of flowering plant in the woodsorrel family known by the common names garden pink-sorrel and broadleaf woodsorrel. It is native to Mexico and parts of Central and South America.

Description

This is a perennial herb growing from a system of small bulbs and spreading via stolons. There is no stem. The leaves arise on long petioles from ground level, each made up of three widely heart-shaped leaflets about 4.5 centimeters wide. 

The inflorescence is an array of several flowers, each with five pink petals (some varieties have white flowers).

Invasive species
It is known on most other continents as an introduced species and a noxious weed and invasive species, as it infests many types of agricultural crops. 

In south-eastern Australia, it is found in gardens, on roadsides, disturbed sites and is most likely a garden escape. It is spread by conveyance of soils containing the plant’s bulbils, as well as by runoffs, ants, and by larger animals like dogs and birds.

Gallery

References

External links
Jepson Manual Treatment

Oxalis latifolia - Photo gallery

latifolia
Flora of Mexico
Flora of Central America
Flora of South America